was a Japanese politician who served as Governor of Saga Prefecture from 1991 to 2003.

References

1925 births
2018 deaths
Governors of Saga Prefecture
People from Saga Prefecture